Adolf Stern (25 December 1849, Grünstadt, Rhineland-Palatinate – 24 August 1907, Mannheim) was a German chess master.

Born into a merchant Jewish family, he was the second child of Jacob Stern and Babette Caroline. At the beginning of his chess career, he participated in Baden-Baden 1870 chess tournament, playing only four games (scoring 1½/4)  because of Franco-Prussian War (as a Bavarian reservist, he fought in the war).
In August 1871 he played in Wiesbaden (section I) scoring 3/4.
In September 1871 he took second place, behind Samuel Mieses, in Bad Ems.
In July/August 1878 he took ninth in Frankfurt (the 12th WDSB–Kongress, Louis Paulsen won).

References

Literature
 Stefan Haas: Das Schachturnier Baden-Baden 1870, der unbekannte Schachmeister Adolf Stern. Rattmann, Ludwigshafen 2006. 

1849 births
1907 deaths
19th-century German Jews
German chess players
Jewish chess players
19th-century chess players